The Onyar is a Spanish river in Girona, Catalonia that begins at the Guilleries massif at the apex of the Catalan Transversal Range and the Pre-Coastal Range. It joins the Ter at the city of Girona.
The river passes by a touristic place called Onyar's houses, where all these homes are very colourful and they reflects themselves into the river Onyar

Tributaries
 Riera Gotarra
 Bogantó

References

Rivers of Spain
Rivers of Catalonia
Girona